Lam Ka Koi (born 6 January 1972) is a football (soccer) player who plays as a defender. He currently plays for G.D. Lam Pak in the Campeonato da 1ª Divisão do Futebol.

References 

1972 births
Living people
Macau footballers
Macau international footballers
G.D. Lam Pak players
C.D. Monte Carlo players
Association football defenders